Ralph William Sallee, meteorologist and Commander (USN Retired), was born in Arkansas November 26, 1927 and retired from the U.S. Navy in 1975. During the Korean War he served aboard the aircraft carrier USS Oriskany. Later he served in Hawaii, Guam, Port Hueneme, California and at the U.S. Naval Station Sangley Point near Manila in the Philippines (1964–1966).

On September 11, 1967 "Lt. Comdr. R. W. Sallee relieved Lt. A. W. Snell as Officer-in-charge, Det. Charlie, Antarctic Support Activities." In recognition of his meteorological contribution during his service with Operation Deep Freeze a mapped area of the Antarctica was named Sallee Snowfield by the Advisory Committee on Antarctic Names (US-ACAN. )

Further Reading regarding Ralph W. Sallee's work for Operation Deep Freeze in the Antarctica:

"The Use of Weather Satellites in Antarctica" by RALPH W. SALLEE, Lieutenant Commander, USN U.S. Naval Support Force, Antarctica ANTARCTIC JOURNAL (September–October 1967). Pgs 216-220.

"Night Flight to Antarctica" by JOHN HOSHKO, JR. Lieutenant, USNR, U.S. Naval Support Force, Antarctica. ANTARCTIC JOURNAL (November–December 1967). Pgs 261-264.

He died on February 9, 2022.

References

1927 births
2022 deaths
American meteorologists
20th-century American naval officers
Military personnel from Arkansas